The 2019–20 Iowa State Cyclones men's basketball team represents Iowa State University during the 2019–20 NCAA Division I men's basketball season. The Cyclones are coached by Steve Prohm, who is in his fifth season at Iowa State. They play their home games at Hilton Coliseum in Ames, Iowa as members of the Big 12 Conference.

Previous season
The Cyclones finished the 2018–19 season 23–12, 9–9 in Big 12 play to finish in fifth place. They defeated Baylor, Kansas State, and Kansas to win the Big 12 Conference tournament. They lost to Ohio State in the First Round of the NCAA tournament.

Offseason

Departures

Incoming transfers

2019 recruiting class

Roster

}

Schedule and results

|-
!colspan=12 style=| Regular Season

|-
!colspan=12 style=| Big 12 Tournament

See also
 2019–20 Iowa State Cyclones women's basketball team

References

Iowa State Cyclones men's basketball seasons
Iowa State
Iowa State Cyc
Iowa State Cyc